Budi Santoso (born 8 June 1975) is an Indonesian retired badminton player from PB Djarum club, who joined the club since 1982. He was part of the national team that clinched the men's team title at the Asian Games in 1998, and at the Thomas Cup in 2002. Santoso had been ranked in the world top ten. After retired from the international tournament, he started his career as a coach in Mutiara Bandung club, and later for the men's singles team in the national camp.

Achievements

IBF World Grand Prix 
The World Badminton Grand Prix sanctioned by International Badminton Federation (IBF) since 1983.

Men's singles

 IBF Grand Prix tournament
 IBF Grand Prix Finals tournament

IBF International 
Men's singles

References

External links 
 
 

1975 births
Living people
People from Klaten Regency
Sportspeople from Central Java
Indonesian male badminton players
Badminton players at the 1998 Asian Games
Asian Games gold medalists for Indonesia
Asian Games medalists in badminton
Medalists at the 1998 Asian Games
Badminton coaches